Andreas Miroslav Palicka (born 10 July 1986) is a Swedish handball player for Paris Saint-Germain and the Swedish national team.

His father came to Sweden from Czechoslovakia.

Individual awards
Swedish handball player of the year 2020
All-Star Goalkeeper of the World Championship: 2021

References

External links

1986 births
Living people
Swedish male handball players
THW Kiel players
Rhein-Neckar Löwen players
Aalborg Håndbold players
Handball-Bundesliga players
Expatriate handball players
Swedish expatriate sportspeople in Denmark
Swedish expatriate sportspeople in Germany
Swedish expatriate sportspeople in France
Swedish people of Czech descent
Sportspeople from Lund
Redbergslids IK players
Handball players at the 2020 Summer Olympics
Olympic handball players of Sweden
21st-century Swedish people